This is a list of association handball clubs located in Austria.

Men Category
Alpla HC Hard
SG Handball West Wien
Bregenz Handball
Handballclub Fivers Margareten
UHK Krems
HSG Raiffeisen Bärnbach/Köflac
HC Linz AG
Union Basketball Club Sankt Pölten
ULZ Schwaz
Union Leoben
HIT Innsbruck
UHC Gänserndorf
UHC Tulln
SG Handball West Wien
HC Linz AG
ATV
Autohaus 
Pichler 
Trofaiach
HC ece
bulls 
Bruck
UHC Erste Bank Hollabrunn
HSG Graz
HC Kärnten
Team 94
SC Ferlach
HC JCL BW Feldkirch
Vöslauer HC
WAT Fünfhaus

Women Category
Hypo Niederösterreich
MGA Handball
SC Wiener Neustadt
Dornbirn/Schoren
Hypo NÖ 2
Feldkirch
Union Korneuburg
ATV Trofaiach
Atzgersdorf
Stockerau
Admira Landhaus
Fünfhaus
SG Graz
Druck Tulln
UHC Eggenburg
Kärnten.

Handball in Austria
Lists of handball clubs
Handball